Galloway is an unincorporated community in the U.S. state of Michigan.

The community is at the junction of Nelson Road and S. Meridian Rd./NE Gratiot County Line Rd.

A post office named Galloway first opened in Gratiot County on February 16, 1883 with Richard Galloway as the first postmaster. This was closed on January 19, 1885. It was re-established on July 16, 1889, on section 24 in Lafayette Township with Andrew Schurr as the first postmaster of the re-established office. When the postmaster moved across the county line into Lakefield Township, the post office moved as well. This office was closed on October 31, 1902.

References 

Unincorporated communities in Gratiot County, Michigan
Unincorporated communities in Saginaw County, Michigan
Unincorporated communities in Michigan